The following highways are numbered 758:

Canada
Alberta Highway 758
Saskatchewan Highway 758

United States

India 

 National Highway 758